Esmeralda Moya Cañas (Torrejón de Ardoz, Madrid, 31 August 1985) is a Spanish actress and model. She is known especially for her characters in the television series Los protegidos, 90-60-90, diario secreto de una adolescente and Tierra de lobos.

Biography 

At the age of 16, Moya started working as a model, participating in several campaigns and national and international magazines. For some time, she lived with her mother in different cities, such as Paris, London, Milan, New York, and Tokyo. Currently, she lives in Torrejón de Ardoz. After a time dedicated to fashion, Esmeralda considered her future, and it was then that she decided to return to Madrid and begin her acting studies at Cristina Rota's school.

She made her debut on the small screen with Circulo rojo in 2006. In 2008, she appeared in sporadic roles in series such as Desaparecida and El castigo.

In 2009, she made her debut on the big screen with Mentiras y Gordas, by Alfonso Albacete and David Menkes, which premiered on March 27 of that year. She starred in the movie with Mario Casas and Ana de Armas. During the same year, she also had regular roles in TVE's U.C.O and Antena 3's 90-60-90.

In 2009, Esmeralda joined the cast of Cuatro's series, Hay alguien ahí, where she played Amanda for two seasons.

She gained great popularity in 2010 with her character Claudia Ruano for the Antena 3 series Los protegidos, where she shared the cast with Ana Fernández and Luis Fernández. Esmeralda left the series in the third and final season of the series.

In 2011, she starred in Telecinco's mini-series La Baronesa, a biopic of the life of Baronesa Thyssen. Esmeralda played Carmen Cervera in her younger years. Also that year, she joined the filming of the Telecinco series Homicidios alongside Eduardo Noriega and Celia Freijeiro, where she played Helena.

In 2012, she was part of the cast of the film Clara No es nombre de mujer by director Pepe Carbajo.

In 2013, she joined the third season of the Telecinco series Tierra de Lobos, in which she participated until the end of the following year. In 2014, she participated in the daily series of Cuatro Ciega a citas. Also that year, she starred in the Televisión española series Víctor Ros alongside Carles Francino.

In 2015, we saw her again on the big screen in the film Solo Química, alongside Alejo Sauras and Ana Fernández. She also appeared in Sara Escudero's Te elegiría otra vez that year.

In 2016, it was announced that the TVE series Víctor Ros would be renewed for a second season, in which she wouldl appear again.

Also in 2016, she participated in the new Telecinco series La verdad, alongside Jon Kortajarena.

Her signing for the La 1 series Servir y proteger was announced in November 2021.

Filmography

Films

Television series

Theater

Television programs

References

External links 
 Esmeralda Moya on IMDb

Spanish television actresses
Spanish female models
Actors from the Community of Madrid
Living people
1985 births